Pithecopus palliatus is a species of frog in the subfamily Phyllomedusinae. It is found in Bolivia, Brazil, Ecuador, Peru, and possibly Colombia. Its natural habitats are subtropical or tropical moist lowland forests and intermittent freshwater marshes. It is threatened by habitat loss.

References

Phyllomedusinae
Amphibians described in 1873
Taxa named by Wilhelm Peters
Taxonomy articles created by Polbot